Sir Francis William Forbes (1784 – 8 November 1841) was a Chief Justice of Newfoundland, and the first Chief Justice of New South Wales.

Early life
Forbes was born and educated in Bermuda, the son of Dr. Francis Forbes M.D. and his wife Mary, née Tucker. His elder half-brother was Very Rev Patrick Forbes who was Moderator of the General Assembly of the Church of Scotland in 1829.

At the age of 19 Francis travelled to London, England to study law at Lincoln's Inn. He was called to the Bar in 1812 and became a Crown Law Officer in Bermuda and married Amelia Sophia Grant in 1813, returning to England in 1815.

Newfoundland
In 1816 he was invited to be Chief Justice of Newfoundland, and was sworn in at St. John's in July, 1816. While in Newfoundland, he severely curtailed the powers of the naval governors. In 1820, he wrote the lyrics of the song "The Banks of Newfoundland". Poor health and three severe winters forced Forbes to return to London to recuperate in 1822. Rather than return to Newfoundland’s maritime climate, Forbes accepted a position as Chief Justice of New South Wales and Van Diemen’s Land.

New South Wales

In 1822, he was appointed to be Chief Justice of the Supreme Court of New South Wales, to oversee the reform of the administration of the legal system in the colony, following the inquiry into the colony's affairs by commissioner John Bigge. Before departing for Australia, he helped draft the New South Wales Act 1823 (4 Geo. IV c. 96) which, along with the Charter of Justice issued under it on 13 October 1823, replaced the legal tribunals of convict days with a Supreme Court possessing comprehensive jurisdiction.  Under the new system, Forbes was not only the sole judge, subject only to the appellate power of the Governor, but also an ex officio member of the Executive Council and the Legislative Council, and all colonial legislation had to be certified by him as not being repugnant to the laws of England.

Forbes arrived in Sydney in March 1824 and the Court commenced on 17 May 1824. The Governor, Sir Thomas Brisbane, was impressed by Forbes, and in his dispatches of 1 July and 12 August 1824 reported that "since the arrival of the chief justice the state of the Colony has assumed a new tone". Forbes had no difficulties with Brisbane, but it was not long before he came into conflict with the new governor, Sir Ralph Darling. It was proposed to pass acts for the purpose of restraining the liberty of the press, and Forbes refused to certify them as he considered them repugnant to the laws of England. He pointed out how necessary it was to go carefully, as in the then conditions of the colony the people looked upon the Supreme Court as their protection against absolute power. "I had been appointed by Parliament", said Forbes, "to see that the laws of the Empire were not encroached upon ... I refused to certify the Governor's Bills because I thought them repugnant to law ... What legal right could the Governor claim to press me further?". After great discussion the issue went to the Colonial Office, whose legal advisors were of opinion that Forbes was right in refusing to certify the act for licensing newspapers.  They thought he had been wrong with regard to the newspaper stamp act but, as there was no reason to doubt that he had formed his opinion honestly, he had executed his duty in acting upon it. Forbes' workload had been and continued to be heavy, his controversy with Darling was harassing, and his health suffered.

Forbes also championed the introduction of trial by jury in NSW. On 14 October 1824, in the court of Quarter Sessions (so named because they met four times per year), 12 men who had not been convicts were sworn in as the first jurors. There was intense opposition from the magistrates to this initiative as they had formerly ruled on all the criminal trials in these courts.

Forbes was also a strong advocate for free education. In 1830 he laid the foundation stone for the non-denominational Sydney College (now Sydney Grammar School), having spent the previous five years chairing the committee for its establishment. He remained as chairman of the board of trustees when the school finally opened in 1835 in College Street near Hyde Park.

Later life
Forbes' heavy workload and conflict with Governor Darling led him to take 12 months sick leave in 1836-37. While supposedly convalescing in England, Forbes agreed to give evidence at the Molesworth Committee on Transportation. This committee was reviewing the transportation of convicts to the Australian colonies. He spoke forcefully against the practice of internal transportation, whereby convicts who misbehaved were sent to secondary prisons such as Norfolk Island. While not directly opposing the convict system, he tried to argue for a more humane and less harsh method of punishment.

Early in 1837, Forbes' received the news that he would be given a knighthood. After recovering from two bouts of influenza, he made it to St James Palace on 5 April 1837 to be dubbed by King William IV. Francis Forbes, the boy from Bermuda with a rich Scottish heritage and a passion for justice returned to Australia as Sir Francis Forbes. 
 
Given all this activity, it is not surprising that the time Forbes spent on sick leave in England did not help him regain his strength. He even tried ‘taking the waters’ at a variety of spa resorts in France and Italy, but to no avail. He felt like he was "sinking under the weight" of his office and his hand shook as he tried to write his resignation letter. (see ML MSS 403/6, 135 at 137). 
 	
After spending time in England and Europe, he admitted that his "nerves [were] so shattered as to affect my powers of mind as well as body". He retired as Chief Justice of New South Wales on 1 July 1837. His dream of a comfortable retirement at ‘Edinglassie’, a rural retreat he built on his property in the Nepean, was never realised as he needed to be close to his doctors.

Forbes died in a rented house, "Leitrim Lodge", in Newtown, New South Wales, on 8 November 1841. He was only 57 years old. He was survived by his mother, his wife – Lady Amelia, and their two sons who were studying at Cambridge in England.

Legacy
The town of Forbes in central New South Wales is named after him.

The Francis Forbes Society for Australian Legal History, based in Sydney, is named after him.

Mount Forbes in Queensland is named after him, but the name originally referred to the mountain now known as Mount Walker, Queensland while the Mount Forbes name is now assigned to an adjacent locality.

Forbes Street in Darlinghurst is named after him.

The State Library of New South Wales holds a candelabrum that was given to Forbes by "the colonists of New South Wales" in 1839 after he retired. It was given with words of high praise:

"Nothing but the highest moral firmness and integrity, combined with that genius and learning for which you are so eminently distinguished, could have overcome the opposition and difficulties which you have had to encounter."

These grateful "colonists" had raised the mighty sum of 260 pounds, 5 shillings and 6 pence (at least AUS$33,000 in 2016 money) through public donations. There being a dearth of silversmiths in the new colony, they commissioned Benjamin Smith the second, a London-based silversmith to create this elaborate piece. It weighs over 11 kg and is made of brushed and polished silver.

See also
List of judges of the Supreme Court of New South Wales

References

External links
Many of Forbes's NSW cases and decisions are online at AustLii:
Decisions of the Superior Courts of New South Wales, 1788-1899
Superior Courts of New South Wales (pre-1900) Case Notes 

Francis Forbes Society for Australian Legal History

 Colonial Secretary's papers 1822-1877, State Library of Queensland- includes digitised letters written by Forbes to the Colonial Secretary of New South Wales

Chief Justices of New South Wales
Judges of the Supreme Court of New South Wales
Australian people of Scottish descent
1784 births
1841 deaths
Colony of New South Wales judges
Newfoundland Colony judges
19th-century Australian judges
Members of the New South Wales Legislative Council
19th-century Australian politicians
Bermudian lawyers
Bermudian emigrants